Rhododendron concinnum (秀雅杜鹃) is a rhododendron species native to Guizhou, Henan, Hubei, Shaanxi, Sichuan, and Yunnan in China, where it grows at altitudes of 2300–3000 meters. It is a shrub that grows to 1.5–3 m in height, with leaves that are oblong, elliptic, ovate, oblong-lanceolate or ovate-lanceolate, 2.5–7.5 by 1.5–3.5 cm in size. Flowers are pale pink to deep purplish red.

References
 "Rhododendron concinnum", Hemsley, J. Linn. Soc., Bot. 26: 21. 1889.

concinnum